Osbyholm Castle is a castle at Hörby Municipality in Scania, Sweden.

History
Osbyholm Castle was built during the first half of the 17th century, probably during the time the estate was owned by Lene Ramel, daughter of Danish royal councilor  Henrik Ramel (1601-1653), country commissioner of  Scania. The estate was inherited by Ove Ramel (1637-1685). Following the Treaty of Roskilde  in 1658, Scania became a possession of the Swedish Crown.  Osbyholm Castle was sold to Olof Nilsson Engelholm fra Malmø. In 1750, an extensive restoration of Osbyholm were made.  In 1853, a new central part was built, which was provided with a third floor with a flat, balustrade-edged roof. In 1931, Baroness Anna Trolle had the castle rebuilt according to drawings by the architect Leon Nilsson.

See also
List of castles in Sweden

References

External links
Osbyholms slott website

Castles in Skåne County